Palmetto Pointe is a television series that debuted during PAX-TV's transition to i: Independent Television. The series first aired on August 28, 2005, with its last episode airing on October 16, 2005. It was the first television series shot on location in Charleston, South Carolina, where the series was set.

Overview
The program had a sponsorship deal with Cheerwine, whose soft drinks were shown onscreen in every episode. It was cancelled due to viewership so low that it "barely registered".

Palmetto Pointe was a creative and financial failure, marred by poor production values. It was also derided by some of its few viewers as a clone of both Dawson's Creek and One Tree Hill, series which shot in Wilmington, North Carolina and established that city's reputation as a filming location. Seven episodes of the series were produced, but only five aired. It ended in bankruptcy, with the cast and crew failing to receive their final paychecks.

Cast
 Tim Woodward Jr. as Tristan Sutton
 Brent Lovell as Logan Jones
 Sarah Edwards as Millison Avery
 Madison Weidberg as Lacy Timberline
 Will Triplett as Josh Davidson
 Amanda Baker as Callah O'Connell

John Wesley Shipp guest-starred on an episode, playing Michael Jones.

References

External links

2000s American teen drama television series
2005 American television series debuts
2005 American television series endings
Ion Television original programming
Serial drama television series
English-language television shows
Television shows set in Charleston, South Carolina